Yashaw Adem (died 5 December 2014) was a British Turkish actor.

Filmography

References

External links

Turkish male television actors
2014 deaths
Turkish male film actors
Year of birth missing